The Harley Lyrics is the usual name for a collection of lyrics in Middle English, Anglo Norman (Middle French), and Latin found in Harley MS 2253, a manuscript dated ca. 1340 in the British Library's Harleian Collection. The lyrics contain "both religious and secular material, in prose and verse and in a wide variety of genres." The manuscript is written in three recognisable hands: scribe A, scribe B or the Ludlow scribe, and scribe C.

The manuscript
Harley MS 2253 contains 141 leaves of parchment or folios measuring 11 1/2 by 6 1/2 inches. It can be divided into two parts based on content: the first 48 leaves, booklets one (quires 1-2, folios 1-22) and two (quires 3-4, folios 23-48), contain religious poetry in the late-thirteenth century hand known as scribe A, whilst the remaining five booklets are written in the early-fourteenth century hand of  the Ludlow scribe; apart from some pigment recipes at the beginning of booklet three (quires 5, folios 49-52) penned by scribe C. Containing miscellaneous material, secular as well as religious, in prose and verse, this division is not, however, reflected in the quire division, since the division is found on folio 49, part of a quire running from folio 47 to 52; an earlier assumption that this division indicated two separate manuscripts bound together is therefore incorrect.

The Ludlow scribe 
Nothing is known about the identities of scribes A and C, however in discussing scribe B Fein informs us that "Much has been written about the Ludlow scribe, especially since Carter Revard’s landmark research that dates his hand as it appears in three manuscripts and forty-one legal writs."  The Ludlow scribe like a number of others is, because of the lack of evidence and the distance of time, somewhat anonymous yet their 'hands' (their characteristic writing style) makes them recognizable. "As the maker of a key manuscript, the Ludlow scribe is a leading figure among a growing company of copyists now recognized for the value of what they preserved."  There is evidence that this scribe "flourished as a professional legal scribe in the vicinity of Ludlow from 1314 to 1349." Those aforementioned forty-one legal writs are dated from December 18, 1314, to April 13, 1349. Fein notes that "If he was in his twenties when he inscribed the first of these documents, then he was born in the last decade of the thirteenth century. He may have died during the Black Death, which swept through England from 1348 to 1350, so his dates can roughly be set from about 1290 to about 1350."

The metanarrative 
Revard explains that "...a savvy reader of the whole anthology can see that there is a metanarrative that unifies the anthology."  he further explains that a metanarrative works by, what has been called, "oppositional thematics".  That is to say that, each text in the collection is deliberately placed such that it opposes or speaks to the narrative or viewpoint of the preceding texts or texts.  In booklet three though, we can see that there is not always a clear relationship and that a knowledge of the sources used by the scribe to set up such oppositions is required to fully grasp the inter-textual meaning. The two poems which precede scribe C's recipes, are ABC a femmes  and De l’Yver et de l’Esté, both are Anglo-Norman or Middle French. They appear to have nothing in particular to say to each other. The former is a text that celebrates women, highlighting their decency, kindness and long suffering natures. Fein observes that the poem “…deftly equates the sexual pleasure women hold for men with the heavenly delight, healing, and salvation ushered in by Mary’s role in God’s incarnation.” The writer asserts that any man who does not appreciate the worthiness of women is a base creature. The latter however is a Debate poem "...a late medieval form that might have been inspired by and modeled on Virgil’s Eclogues."  It concerns an argument between the Summer and the Winter that seems to have almost pagan overtones. The actual relationship of these texts can only be guessed at.

The texts in booklet four however are more clearly related. By virtue of the number of texts it contains, it represents far more complex contextual patterns and references. However it begins with Hagiography, a Saint's Life. Incipit vita sancti Ethelberti, tells the story of St Ethelbert, who begins as a King but ends as martyr, he is killed as a consequence of his honourable and virtuous behaviour in spite of a vision which shows his future murder. Further into the booklet we meet another apparently honourable and virtuous figure in the earliest surviving English serventes, "...that is, a poem made to mock a beaten enemy."  Sitteth alle stille ant herkneth to me also called A Song of Lewes, tells the story of the Earl of Leicester, Simon de Montfort, a hero of the Second Barons' War and how he achieved a great victory against the forces of the King at the Battle of Lewes on 14 May 1264. The text which follows, Chaunter m’estoit, describes his death at the Battle of Evesham, August 4, 1265 where he was killed and dismembered. In this Anglo Norman text de Montfort is eulogised as a martyr and compared favourably to Thomas Becket. Fein tells us that this last text was an expression of a desire by some to see Simon de Montfort canonised, a desire that never bore fruit. The relationship between these three texts is interesting, as is their relationship to the text which follows three short texts concerned with the brevity of life. Fein writes "Looking beyond the praise of Montfort, one senses, too, how the scribe wishes to issue a warning on earthly pride:"  In Lystneth, lordynges! A newe song Ichulle bigynne, Sir Simon Fraser, who has also opposed his King along with William Wallace and Robert the Bruce has been captured and is sent to London to be hanged, then drawn and quartered. "The tone of the piece is vigorously nationalistic and anti-Scots." The parallels are clear, as Fein illustrates "The scribe’s interesting arrangement of material conveys many messages in itself. The trilingual meditation on mortality (arts. 24a, 24a*, 24b) points forward to this poem of public execution as well as backward to the death in battle of Simon de Montfort, who was also dismembered." Thus the French Simon de Montfort is compared to another traitor the Scottish Sir Simon Fraser and to a true martyr and saint, the Anglo Saxon Ethelbert; thus creating the metanarrative of booklet four.

Modern transcriptions
G. L. Brook is considered an authority on this manuscript. He first published The Harley Lyrics: The Middle English Lyrics of MS. Harley 2253 in 1948 and released a second edition containing "minor corrections and revised bibliography" in 1956. His edition includes a detailed introduction including information on the physicality and orthography of the manuscript, context on secular, courtly love, and religious lyrics, the metre of lyrics, and a brief discussion on the lyrics as literature. His edition includes thirty-two of the original lyric verses included in Harley MS 2253.

Table of Contents - Harley Manuscript 2253

References

External links
Entry for Harley 2253, from British Library
Seminar reading on Harley 2253, from Lancaster University
The Harley Lyrics, Wessex Parallel WebTexts
, Medieval English Dictionary

FURTHER READING

Fein, Susanna, ed. and trans., with David Raybin and Jan Ziolkowski. The Complete Harley 2253 Manuscript, Volume 1. TEAMS Middle English Texts Series, Kalamazoo: Medieval Institute, 2015, x, 508 pp. Edition and translation of fols. 1-48. . Also published online: Robbins Library Digital Projects, University of Rochester, http://d.lib.rochester.edu/teams/publication/fein-harley2253-volume-1
Fein, Susanna, ed. and trans., with David Raybin and Jan Ziolkowski. The Complete Harley 2253 Manuscript, Volume 2. TEAMS Middle English Texts Series, Kalamazoo: Medieval Institute, 2014. x, 521 pp. Edition and translation of fols. 49-92. . Also published online: Robbins Library Digital Projects, University of Rochester, http://d.lib.rochester.edu/teams/publication/fein-harley2253-volume-2
Fein, Susanna, ed. and trans., with David Raybin and Jan Ziolkowski. The Complete Harley 2253 Manuscript, Volume 3. TEAMS Middle English Texts Series, Kalamazoo: Medieval Institute, 2015. x, 420 pp. Edition and translation of fols. 93-120. . Also published online: Robbins Library Digital Projects, University of Rochester, http://d.lib.rochester.edu/teams/publication/fein-harley2253-volume-3
Fein, Susanna, ed. Studies in the Harley Manuscript: The Scribes, Contents, and Social Contexts of British Library MS Harley 2253. Kalamazoo: Medieval Institute Publications, 2000.
Ker, N. R., intro. Facsimile of British Museum MS. Harley 2253. EETS o.s. 255. London: Oxford University Press, 1965.

14th-century books
14th-century Christian texts
Harleian Collection